Ficus matiziana is a species of plant in the family Moraceae. It is found in Brazil, Colombia, Guyana, and Venezuela.

References

matiziana
Least concern plants
Taxonomy articles created by Polbot